Dhiya Eddin Mahjoub Musa Kano (born 30 May 1995) is a Sudanese professional footballer who plays as a midfielder for Al-Merrikh and the Sudan national football team.

References 

Living people
1995 births
Sudanese footballers
Sudan international footballers
Al-Merrikh SC players
Association football midfielders
Alamal SC Atbara players
2021 Africa Cup of Nations players